The Opluridae, or Madagascan iguanas, are a family of moderately sized lizards native to Madagascar and Grande Comore. There are eight species in two genera, with most of the species being in Oplurus. The Opluridae, along with Brachylophus of Fiji, are the only extant members of the Pleurodonta that are found outside the Americas.

The family includes species that live amongst rocks, some that live in trees, and two that prefer sandy habitats. All of the species lay eggs, and have teeth that resemble those of the true iguanas. A study was done to identify the foraging mode of the Oplurus species. The species was highly favored to be ambush foragers due to their low movement per min (MPM) and percent time spent moving (PTM) During rainy and dry seasons of the jardin botanique A of Ampijoroa forest.
the two genera are easily distinguished. The smaller two Chalarodon species have a dorsal crest, particularly distinct in males, and has a smoother tail covered in similarly sized scales.  Genus Oplurus has large segmented spiny scales, and no dorsal crest along the spine.

Previously, due to their isolation from all other iguanians, it was thought that oplurids had very ancient origins. A study of mitochondrial DNA sequences had dated the split between Opluridae and Iguanidae (within which Opluridae are sometimes classified as the subfamily Oplurinae) at about 165 million years ago, during the Middle Jurassic. The study supported the monophyly of the expanded Iguanidae, and put Oplurinae in the basal position. This dating was consistent with a vicariant origin of the Madagascan iguanians, since Madagascar is believed to have separated from Africa (during the breakup of Gondwana) around 140 million years ago. However, a 2022 study found Opluridae to be the sister group to the Leiosauridae, a family of iguanians found in South America. Both groups were found to have only diverged during the Paleocene, about 60 million years ago. As this divergence was too recent to be a result of vicariance, it was proposed that the Opluridae colonized Madagascar via oceanic dispersal, either directly from South America to Madagascar, or from South America to either Africa or Antarctica (not yet glaciated at the time), and then from there to Madagascar.

Species

Family Opluridae
 Genus Chalarodon
 Chalarodon madagascariensis
 Chalarodon steinkampi
 Genus Oplurus
 Oplurus cuvieri
 Oplurus cyclurus
 Oplurus fierinensis
 Oplurus grandidieri
 Oplurus quadrimaculatus
 Oplurus saxicola

References

External links
 Family Opluridae

 
Lizard families
Extant Middle Jurassic first appearances
Callovian first appearances